Christopher Bell (born July 26, 1971 in St. Pauls, North Carolina) is an American professional poker player from Raleigh, North Carolina who won the 2010 World Series of Poker $5,000 Pot Limit Omaha Hi-Low Split-8 or Better event. He has also made three final tables at the World Poker Tour (WPT).

World Series of Poker 
Bell has 14 cashes at the World Series of Poker (WSOP) which includes four final tables with one bracelet. He won his bracelet at the 2010 World Series of Poker in the $5,000 Pot Limit Omaha Hi-Low Split-8 or Better event, earning $327,040 after defeating professional poker player Dan Shak during heads-up play, other professionals at the final table included English professional Dave "Devilfish" Ulliott (3rd), Eight time bracelet winner and 1988 World Series of Poker Main Event runner-up Erik Seidel (5th), Dutch Pro Rob Hollink (7th), and three time bracelet winner and 1981 World Series of Poker Main Event runner-up Perry Green (8th). Bell almost won a bracelet two years earlier at the 2008 World Series of Poker in the $2,000 Pot-Limit Hold'em event where he finished second to Davidi Kitai, earning $155,806, that same year he also made the final table in the $10,000 World Championship Pot-Limit Hold'em event and finished in 6th place for $157,168. Bell's first WSOP Final table cash was at the 2007 World Series of Poker in the $2,500 Omaha/Seven-Card Stud Hi-Low-8 or Better event which he finished in fifth place for $39,109.

World Series of Poker bracelets

World Poker Tour 

Bell has 13 cashes at the World Poker Tour (WPT), which includes three (Six-Handed) WPT final tables, third at the WPT 2005 Mirage Poker Showdown to winner Gavin Smith and runner-up Ted Forrest, His second WPT final table was at the WPT 2006 Borgata Poker Open finishing fifth for $314,280 and the third was at the WPT Hollywood Poker Open, finishing in fourth for $124,966. He came close to another final table when he finished in ninth place at the 2003 Borgata Poker Open.

As of 2010, his total live tournament winnings exceed $2,300,000.

References

External links
 WPT Profile

1971 births
Living people
People from St. Pauls, North Carolina
World Series of Poker bracelet winners
World Series of Poker Circuit event winners
American poker players
People from Raleigh, North Carolina